Stoycho Vassilev Breskovski  (December 25, 1934, Granit, Stara Zagora Province, Bulgaria – January 15, 2004, Sofia, Bulgaria) was a Bulgarian paleontologist.

Biography

Stoycho Breskovski was the only son of educators Vassil Stoychev Breskovski (1902 - 1978) and Paraskeva Breskovska (1906 - 1988). After receiving his primary and secondary education in Plovdiv, he studied geology at Sofia University and graduated in 1958. Then, he took active part in Bulgarian geological survey and in the preparation of the geologic map of Bulgaria at scale of 1:200,000. Later Dr. Breskovski was noted for his research on Lower Cretaceous, Barremian fauna. He was also credited for discovering, identifying and discerning several families, subfamilies, genera and species of ammonites.

From 1974 to 1995 Breskovski had been research associate and curator of the paleontology collection at the  National Museum of Natural History in Sofia. He contributed to the collections at the natural history museums in the Bulgarian cities of Elena, Rousse, Razgrad, and Shumen. In later age he tried to reconcile his various hobbies of  collecting stamps, pocket calendars, phillumeny and philately with science. His older sister, Vesselina Breskovska, was professor of mineralogy, dean and vice rector at Sofia University. He was survived by his wife of 42 years and fellow paleontologist,  Nona Motekova, a son and a daughter, a granddaughter and a grandson, and a siamese cat.

Honors 

A genus and two species of Lower Cretaceous ammonites bear his name.

Selected bibliography 

 V. Tzankov, S. Breskovski (1985), Ammonites des familles Holcodiscidae Spath, 1924 et Astieridiscidae Tzankov & Breskovski, 1982. II. Description paléontologique, Geologica Balcanica, 15.5, 3-53.
 V. Tzankov, S. Breskovski (1985), Ammonites des familles Holcodiscidae Spath, 1924 et Astieridiscidae Tzankov & Breskovski, 1982. I. Stratigraphie et notes phylogénétiques, Geologica Balcanica, 15.3, 45-62.
 V. Tzankov, S Breskovski (1982), Volume et contenu de la famille Holcodiscidae Spath, 1924, C.R. Acad. bulg. Sci., 35, 4, 491-93.
 St. Breskovski (1980), Des genres nouveaux du Crétacé inférieur de la famille Desmoceratidae Zittel, 1895 (Ammonoidea). C.R. Acad. bulg. Sci., 33, 2; 245-48.   
 St Breskovski (1977), Sur la classification de la famille Desmoceratidae Zittel, 1895 (Ammonoidea, Crétacé), C. R. Acad. bul. sci, 30, 6: 891-4. 
 St. Breskovski (1977), Genres nouveaux du Crétacé inférieur de la famille Desmoceratidae Zittel, 1895 (Ammonoidea). C.R. Acad. bulg. Sci., 30, 10; 1463-65.
 S. Breskovski (1975), Les zones et sous-zones ammonitiques dans l'étage Barrémien en Bulgarie du Nord-Est, Geologica Balcanica, N.S., 5, 46-66.
 St. Breskovski (1967), Eleniceras - genre nouveau d'ammonites hautériviens, Bull. Geol. Inst., Ser. Paleontology, 16: 47-52. 
  T. Nikolov, St. Breskovski, (1969), Abrytusites – nouveau genre d’ammonites barrémiennes. Bull. Geol. Inst., ser. Paleontology, 18, 91-96.  
 Стойчо Бресковски (1966), Биостратиграфия на барема южно от Брестак, Варненско [Biostratigaphie du Barrémien  au Sud du village de Brestak, dans la région de Varna], Тр. Геолог Бълг., сер. Палеонтология, 8, 71-121.

Notes

References
 C. W. Wright with J.H. Callomon and M.K. Howarth (1996),  Mollusca 4 Revised, Cretaceous Ammonoidea, vol. 4,  in Treatise on Invertebrate Paleontology, Part L (Roger L. Kaesler et el. eds.), Boulder, Colorado: The Geological Society of America  & Lawrence, Kansas: University of Kansas Press, xx + 362 p., 216 fig.
 Jost Wiedmann, Cretaceous Ammonoidea, in M.R. House and J.R. Senior eds (1981), Ammonoidea, Environment, Ecology and Evolutionary Change , London: Academic Press, Systematics Association Special Volume. 18.
 Natalia Dimitrova (1967), Fosilite na Bulgaria. IV. Dolna Kreda - Glavonogi [Fossils of Bulgaria. IV. Lower Crateceous - Cephalopoda (Nautiloidea & Ammonoidea)], Sofia: Bulgarian Academy of Sciences, 424 p., 93 pl. (In Bulgarian with French summary).
 Maria B. Aguirre-Urreta, Peter F. Rawson (2003), Lower Cretaceous ammonites from the Neuquén Basin, Argentina: The Hauterivian genus Holcoptychites, Cretaceous Research 24, 589-613.
 M. Matsukawa, I. Obata & K. Sato (2007), Barremian Ammonite Fauna of the Lower Ishido Formation, eastern part of Sanchu Cretaceous, Japan, Bull. of Tokyo Gakugei Univ. Nat. Sci., 59, 77-87. 
 Hosni Hamama (2010), Barremian and Aptian Mollusca of Gabal Mistan and Gabal Um Mitmani, Al-Malghara Area, Northern Sinai, Egypt, Journal of American Science, 6(12), at 1704.
 Zdeněk Vašíček (2010),  Early Cretaceous ammonites from the Butkov Quarry (Manin Unit, Central Western Carpathians, Slovakia), Acta Geologica Polonica, Vol. 60, No.3, 393-415.
 Peter F. Rawson, M. Beatriz Aguirre-Urreta (2012), Lower Cretaceous ammonites from the Neuquén Basin, Argentina: The Hauterivian genus Spidiscus, Cretaceous Research 33, 97-105.

External links 

 
 
 
 
 
 
 

Bulgarian geologists
1934 births
2004 deaths
Bulgarian paleontologists
People from Stara Zagora Province
Sofia University alumni
20th-century Bulgarian zoologists
20th-century geologists